Bard is a surname. Notable people with the surname include:

 Albert S. Bard (1866–1963), lawyer and civic activist in New York City
 Alexander Bard (born 1961), Swedish philosopher and musician
 Allen J. Bard (born 1933), American chemist
 Anna Bård (born 1980), Danish actress and model
 Ben Bard (1893–1974), American actor
 Charles Bard, 2nd Viscount Bellomont (1647–1667)
 Daniel Bard (born 1985), American baseball pitcher
 David Bard (1744–1815), United States Representative from Pennsylvania
 Derek Bard (born 1995), American amateur golfer
 Ellen Bard (1949–2009), Republican member of the Pennsylvania House of Representatives
 Guy K. Bard (1895–1953), American judge and politician
 Harry Bard (1867–1955), secretary of the Pan American Society of the United States
 Henri Bard (1892–1951), French footballer
 Henry Bard, 1st Viscount Bellomont (1616–1656), English Royalist
 Howard B. Bard (1870–1954), American Unitarian minister
 James Bard (1815–1897), marine artist
 John Bard (1819–1899), Christian philanthropist
 Joseph Bard (1882–1975), expatriate Hungarian writer
 Josh Bard (born 1978), American baseball catcher and designated hitter
 Luke Bard (born 1990), American baseball player
 Maria Bard (1900–1944), German stage actress
 Mary Bard (1904–1970), 20th-century American author
 Mitchell Bard, American foreign policy analyst
 Perry Bard, interdisciplinary artist
 Ralph Austin Bard (1884–1975), Assistant Secretary of the Navy 1941–1944
 Samuel Bard (physician) (1742–1821)
 Samuel Bard (politician) (1825–1878), Governor of Idaho Territory
 Thomas R. Bard (1841–1915), American politician from California
 Wilkie Bard (1874–1944), British vaudeville and music hall entertainer
 William Bard (1778–1853), American banker

Fictional characters:
 Eli Bard (born Eliphas), supervillain from the Marvel Comics universe
 Jason Bard, a DC Comics character
 Monica Bard in General Hospital, an American soap opera on the ABC network